A list of films produced in Egypt in 1975. For an A-Z list of films currently on Wikipedia, see :Category:Egyptian films.

External links
 Egyptian films of 1975 at the Internet Movie Database
 Egyptian films of 1975 elCinema.com

Lists of Egyptian films by year
1975 in Egypt
Lists of 1975 films by country or language